Hexylcaine hydrochloride, also called cyclaine (Merck) or osmocaine, is a short-acting local anesthetic.  It acts by inhibiting sodium channel conduction.  Overdose can lead to headache, tinnitus, numbness and tingling around the mouth and tongue, convulsions, inability to breathe, and decreased heart function.

Synthesis

The reductive amination between 1-Amino-2-propanol [78-96-6] (1) and cyclohexanone gives 1-Cyclohexylamino-2-propanol [103-00-4] (2). Treatment with benzoyl chloride gives the ester, completing the synthesis of Hexylcaine (3).

References

Local anesthetics
Benzoate esters
Cyclohexylamines